Friends & Lovers may refer to:

Film 
Friends and Lovers (1931 film), starring Adolphe Menjou and directed by Victor Schertzinger
Friends & Lovers (1999 film), an American romantic-drama film starring Stephen Baldwin and Claudia Schiffer

Music 
"Friends and Lovers" (Gloria Loring and Carl Anderson song), 1986
"Friends and Lovers" (Bernard Butler song), 1999
Friend & Lover, an American folk-singing duo composed of the husband-and-wife team, Jim and Cathy Post
Friends and Lovers (album), a 1999 album by Bernard Butler
Friends & Lovers (album), a 2014 album by Marsha Ambrosius

Television 
Friends and Lovers (TV series) (also known as Paul Sand in Friends and Lovers), 1974–1975 TV series set in Boston starring Paul Sand
"Friends & Lovers" (CSI), an episode of the American television series CSI
"Friends and Lovers" (NCIS), an episode of the American television series NCIS
"Friends and Lovers" (Three's Company episode), an episode of the American television series Three's Company 
"Friends and Lovers" (Melrose Place episode), an episode of the American television series Melrose Place